Six Degrees: Our Future on a Hotter Planet (358 pages),  is a 2007 (2008 in the US) non-fiction book by author Mark Lynas about global warming.  The book looks and attempts to summarize results from scientific papers on climate change.

Contents 

The first chapter describes the expected effects of climate change with one degree celsius (1 °C) increase in average global temperature since pre-industrial times.

The second chapter describes the effects of two degrees average temperature and so forth until Chapter 6 which shows the expected effects of an increase of six Celsius degrees (6 °C) average global temperature. The effects are also compared to paleoclimatic studies, with six degrees of warming compared back to the Cretaceous. 

Special coverage is given to the positive feedback mechanisms that could dramatically accelerate climate change. The book explains how the release of methane hydrate and the release of methane from melting permafrost could unleash a major extinction event. Carbon cycle feedbacks, the demise of coral, the destruction of the Amazon rainforest, and extreme desertification are also described, with five or six degrees of warming potentially leading to the complete uninhabitability of the tropics and subtropics, as well as extreme water and food shortages, possibly leading to mass migration of billions of people.

TV show 
A National Geographic Channel TV programme, Six Degrees Could Change The World, was produced after the book won the Royal Society Prize in 2008.

2020 Update
In April 2020, the author published a rewritten and updated version of the book: Our Final Warning: Six Degrees of Climate Emergency.

See also
 The Age of Stupid
 Environmental migrant
 Tipping point (climatology)
 Environmental issues with coral reefs

References

External links 
 What will climate change do to our planet?, The Sunday Times, March 11, 2007.  Summary of some of the book's key scenarios.
 Six steps to hell, The Guardian, 23 April 2007.  Summary article by the book's author.
 

2007 non-fiction books
2007 in the environment
Climate change books
Documentary films about global warming
National Geographic (American TV channel) original programming